The Flutgraben is a canal in Erfurt, Thuringia, Germany. It is a flood control channel, created between 1890 and 1898 in order to prevent flooding of the river Gera in the city centre of Erfurt.

Canals in Germany
Geography of Thuringia
Buildings and structures in Erfurt
Canals opened in 1898
CFlutgraben